Home Before Dark is a 2020 thriller novel by pseudonymous author Riley Sager. The novel was first published on June 30, 2020 through Dutton. Sager references the 1977 Jay Anson book The Amityville Horror during the novel, which also served as part of Home Before Dark's inspiration.

It focuses on the characters of Maggie Holt, via her first person narrative, and her father Ewan, through excerpts taken from a book. The book-within-a-book focuses on supernatural events that Ewan claims drove them to flee their home and never return.

Synopsis
The novel is told via a split narrative. Maggie Holt narrates events as they happen during current day, while her father Ewan's narrative occurs via passages of his book House of Horrors, which details the family's time at Baneberry Hall during the 1990s. The below synopsis is split into sections, one containing Ewan's narrative and the other containing Maggie's.

House of Horrors 
Ewan and his wife Jess have purchased Baneberry Hall, a Victorian home in need of some repair. The realtor reluctantly informs them that the home was the site of a murder suicide; prior owner Curtis Carver murdered his daughter Katie before taking his own life, leaving his wife Marta to discover their bodies. She deliberately omits that the home also has a history of supernatural activity, which the family comes to discover on their own. Ewan and his family experience several strange events that appear to reference both the Carver murder-suicide as well as the house's original owner, William Garson, and his daughter Indigo. His five-year-old daughter Maggie has expressed fear of a being she calls "Mister Shadow" and has an imaginary playmate called "Miss Pennyface", so named because she has pennies on her eyes. Ewan begins to investigate the house's history despite a promise from his wife that he leave the past alone and is assisted by the housekeeper's (Elsa) teenage daughter Petra. After the kitchen ceiling collapses Ewan hires a local boy to help the caretaker patch up the ceiling and in the process, discovers letters that detail a love affair between Indigo Garson and a painter. The two planned to run away together and marry, only for Indigo's father to discover the plans. The letters contradict local legend that Indigo had committed suicide. This is later confirmed during a seance where Ewan contacts the spirit of Curtis, who leads them to the discovery that Indigo was murdered and that her spirit has been taking revenge by killing young girls in a way that pushes the blame on their fathers. The Holt family is attacked, but manages to flee the house, never to return.

Maggie Holt 
Approximately twenty-five years later, Maggie has grown to despise the book and is hurt at her parents for perpetuating what she sees as lies, as they continue to claim the book's contents as truth, even to Maggie herself. She also believes that whatever truly happened at the house was responsible for her parents' divorce. Ewan sticks to this even on his deathbed, where he also makes Maggie promise to never return to Baneberry Hall since it isn't safe for her to be there. She initially plans on keeping the promise but reneges when she discovers that her father had retained ownership of the house. Maggie revisits Baneberry Hall with the intention to sell it and hires Dane, the son of the prior caretaker, as her assistant. She experiences several strange occurrences happen within the home that mirror events in the book and discovers that her father made yearly visits to the house, contrary to what he told Maggie and the general public. The bones of a teenager, revealed to be Petra, are discovered in the house.

Maggie eventually discovers that there is a backdoor in the house leading to her childhood bedroom and that her father had hired Dane to work on the house prior to Petra's death. Believing Dane to be the killer the two fight. In the process Dane is injured and taken to the hospital. Maggie's mother arrives at the house and reveals that Maggie killed Petra, who had been babysitting while Jess and Ewan went on a date. The evidence pointed to Petra having been pushed down the stairs after a struggle with Maggie. In order to protect her Ewan wrote House of Horror, which Jess says was entirely fictional other than Maggie experiencing night terrors.

The murderer is revealed to actually be Marta Carver, who would occasionally sneak into the house to watch Maggie sleep, due to her reminding Marta of Katie. Maggie would wake and see Marta (who she identified as "Miss Pennyeyes" due to the moonlight shining on her spectacles), prompting the night terrors. When Petra discovers Marta, the woman accidentally kills the teenager during a scuffle. Marta has decided to murder Maggie in order to keep the past hidden and tries to kill her by pushing her down the stairs, only to be pushed down the stairs by Elsa, the former housekeeper. In the aftermath Maggie decides to write a book about the true events of the house. Maggie has since realized that Elsa was "Mister Shadow", as the superstitious housekeeper had crept into her room during her childhood and whispered warnings, as she believed that the house was unlucky. She also muses that she believes she saw Petra before Elsa pushed Marta, which she hopes was the ghost of Petra herself rather than a hallucination, as she would like to thank her and apologize for everything.

Development
Sager began planning the novel after listening to a podcast about The Amityville Horror, as the hosts stated that "most people agree it was a hoax, but no one knows why the Lutz family did it". He felt that this "could be an interesting story to explore" and chose to use the book-within-a-book structure in order to alternate between the fictional novel House of Horrors and Maggie's own first person narrative. Sager has noted that this made the writing more challenging, as "changing something in one meant having to make changes in the other, which would then cause changes in the other."

Release
Home Before Dark was released in hardback in the United States on June 30, 2020 through Dutton. An audiobook adaptation narrated by Cady McClain and Jon Lindstrom was released by Penguin Audio alongside the hardback. Paperback and Kindle editions will be released in the United Kingdom through Hodder & Stoughton in 2021.

Reception
Home Before Dark was on the New York Times Bestseller List for July 19, 2020.

The novel was reviewed by USA Today and BookPage, both of which commented favorably on the use of a book-within-a-book structure. Judith Reveal of the New York Journal of Books also noted the structure in her review, stating that "Although the multiple first-person points of view (written in different print fonts) can at times be distracting, Sager has laid out an exciting story that is hard to put down."

Tina Jordan of the New York Times criticized some of the book's dialogue and supporting characters while also praising the multiple points of view.

Adaptation
In February 2020 Deadline announced that Sony Pictures won film adaptation rights to Home Before Dark. Shawn Levy’s 21 Laps Entertainment is to produce the film. In a July 2020 interview with The Big Thrill, Sager stated that the production process had been impacted by the COVID-19 pandemic.

References

External links
 

American thriller novels
2020 American novels
Novels by Riley Sager
E. P. Dutton books